The State Space Agency of Ukraine (SSAU; , Derzhavne kosmichne ahentstvo Ukrayiny, ДКАУ, DKAU) is the Ukrainian government agency responsible for space policy and programs. Along with the Ukrainian Defense Industry and the Antonov Aeronautical Scientific-Technical Complex, it is a major state complex of the national defense industry of Ukraine.The agency was formed in 1992 based on the Soviet space program infrastructure remaining in Ukraine following the dissolution of the Soviet Union.

The State Space Agency of Ukraine does not specialize in crewed astronautical programs. It is the second of two direct Soviet space program descendants. The Ukrainian city of Dnipro, also known as the Rocket City, during Soviet period was one of the Soviet space rocket manufacturing centers, while the cities of Kyiv and Kharkiv provided various other technological support. Those remnants of the Soviet space program in Ukraine were reorganized into their own space agency. The agency does not have its own spaceport and until 2014, depended on the resources of the Russian Federal Space Agency (the primary inheritor of the Soviet space program).

Before December 9, 2010, the agency was known as Національне космічне агентство України, НКАУ, the National Space Agency of Ukraine (NSAU)

Before 2014, launches were conducted at Kazakhstan's Baikonur and Russia's Plesetsk Cosmodromes. After the Russian annexation of Crimea, launches were conducted on Sea Launch's floating platform, which was soon mothballed. SSAU has ground control and tracking facilities in Kyiv and a control center in Dunaivtsi (Khmelnytskyi Oblast). Other facilities in Yevpatoria, Crimea had to be abandoned due to the 2014 Russian occupation of Crimea. Following the 2014 Russo-Ukrainian War, the agency is transitioning its cooperation efforts away from Russia with participation in alternative space programs.

Main tasks 
 Development of state policy concepts in the sphere of research and peaceful uses of space, as well as in the interests of national security;
 Organization and development of space activities in Ukraine and under its jurisdiction abroad;
 Contributing to state national security and defense capability;
 Organization and development of Ukraine's cooperation with other states and international space organizations.

SSAU is a civil body in charge of co-ordinating the efforts of government installations, research, and industrial companies (mostly state-owned). Several space-related institutes and industries are directly subordinated to SSAU. However, it is not a united and centralized system immediately participating in all stages and details of space programs (like NASA in the United States). A special space force in the military of Ukraine is also absent.

The agency oversees launch vehicle and satellite programs, co-operative programs with the Russian Aviation and Space Agency, the European Space Agency, NASA, and commercial ventures. International participation includes Sea Launch and the Galileo positioning system.

Space program 

Space activities in Ukraine have been pursued over a 10-year span in strict accordance with National Space Programs. Each of them was intended to address the relevant current issues to preserve and further develop the space potential of Ukraine.
The First Program (1993–1997) was called upon to keep up the research and industrial space-related potentiality for the benefit of the national economy and state security as well as to be able to break into the international market of space services. The Second Program (1998–2002) was aimed at creating an internal market of space services, conquering the international space markets by presenting in-house products and services (including launch complexes and spacecraft, space-acquired data, space system components) and integrating Ukraine into the worldwide space community.

The National Space Program of Ukraine for 2003-2007 (NSPU), which was adopted by the Verkhovna Rada of Ukraine (the Parliament of Ukraine) on October 24, 2002, outlines the main goals, assignments, priorities, and methods of maintaining space activity in Ukraine.

The Ukrainian Cabinet of Ministers announced its plans on 13 April 2007 to allocate 312 million euros to the National Space Program for 2007–2011.

Specific programs

 Scientific space research
 Remote sensing of the Earth
 Satellite telecommunication systems
 Development of ground-based infrastructure for navigation and special information system
 Space activities in the interests of national security and defense
 Space complexes
 Development of base elements and advanced space technologies
 Development of research, test and production base of the space sector

Goals of the program
 To develop a national system for Earth observation from outer space to meet the national demands in the social economic sphere and for security and defense purposes
 To introduce satellite systems and communication facilities into the telecommunication infrastructure of the state
 To obtain new fundamental knowledge on near-Earth outer space, the solar system, deep space, biological and physical processes and the microgravity condition
 To create and develop techniques for space access with a view toward realizing national and international projects and to enable the home-made rocket to be employed on the worldwide market of space transportation services
 To elaborate the advanced space facilities
 To ensure the innovative development of the space sector in terms of improving its research, experimental and production basis

History 
 
The agency is a minor descendant of the Soviet space program that was passed mostly to the Russian Federal Space Agency. The agency took over all of the former Soviet defense industrial complex that was located on the territory of Ukraine. The space industry of Ukraine started in 1937 when a group of scientists led by Heorhiy Proskura launched a large stratospheric rocket near Kharkiv.

In 1954, the Soviet government transformed the car producer Yuzhmash (Dnipropetrovsk) into a rocket company. Since that time, the city of Dnipropetrovsk has been known in the Anglophone world as the Soviet Rocket City.

As of April 2009, the Ukrainian National Space Agency was planning to launch a Ukrainian communications satellite by September 2011 and a Sich-2 before the end of 2011.

The Ukrainian built RD-843 engine is used for the upper stage of the European Vega rocket.

The first stage of the U.S. Antares rocket was developed by the Yuznoye SDO and produced by Yuzhmash.

National enterprises of the space industry 
Most of the enterprises are located in Dnipro or Kyiv
Dnipro
 State Enterprise Makarov Yuzhny Machine-Building Plant (Yuzhmash)
 State Enterprise Yangel Yuzhnoye State Design Office
 State Enterprise "Dniprokosmos"
 State Enterprise "Dniprovsky Project Institute"
 Makarov National Center of aero-cosmic education for the youth
 State Enterprise "Center of rocket-space technology standardization"
Kyiv
 State Enterprise "Arsenal Factory"
 State Enterprise "Ukrkosmos"
 State Enterprise "Kyivprylad"
 State Enterprise "Scientific Center of a Precise Machine-building"
 State Joint-Stock Holding Company "Kyiv Radio Plant" (former Production Complex)
 Open Joint-Stock Association "Kyiv Radio Plant"
 Open Joint-Stock Association "RSB-Radio Plant"
 Open Joint-Stock Association "SPC Kurs"
 State Scientific-Production Center "Pryroda"
Kharkiv
 Science-research technological institute of instrument-building (NDTIP)
 Public Stock Association "Khartron"
 Corporation Kommunar
Crimea
 National Space Facilities Control and Testing Center

Launch capabilities

Launch vehicles
Ukraine continues further development and modernization of launch vehicles that were created during the Soviet period, primarily the Cyclone and the Zenith. There also was an attempt to redesign a former intercontinental ballistic missile as the Dnepr rocket. Almost all its launch vehicles are heavily dependent on Russian components.

During 1991–2007, a total of 97 launches of Ukrainian LV were conducted, including, but not limited to launches on the Sea Launch mobile launch pad. In 2006 Ukrainian launch vehicles accounted for 12% of all launches into space in the world.

Ukrainian companies Yuzhnoye Design Office and Yuzhmash have engineered and produced seven types of launch vehicles. Adding strapon boosters to launch vehicles may expand the family of Mayak, which is the latest launch vehicle developed.

Retired 

Tsyklon (ICBM-based 1967–1969) Baikonur, 8 launches (0 launches after 1991)
Tsyklon-2 (ICBM-based 1969–2006) Baikonur, 106 launches (14 launches in 1991–2006)
Tsyklon-3 (ICBM-based 1977–2009) Plesetsk, 122 launches (33 launches in 1991–2009)

In use 
Statistics of Launches of LVs produced in cooperation with Ukrainian enterprises. State Space Agency of Ukraine
Zenit-2 (LRB 1985–2007) Baikonur, 37 launches (22 launches in 1991–2007)
Zenit-2M
Zenit-3SL (LRB 1999–2014) Sea Launch, 36 launches
Zenit-3SLB (LRB 2008–2017) Baikonur, 11 launches
Zenit-3F
Dnepr (ICBM-based 1999–2015) Baikonur, 22 launches
Antares, production and development of stage one core structure

In development 

Mayak
Cyclone-4M (ICBM-based, 2023) Canso, Nova Scotia

Svityaz project 

The Svityaz, Oril and Sura aerospace rocket complexes (ASRC) is intended for launching of various spacecraft (SC) into circular, elliptic and high-altitude circular, including the geostationary (GSO), orbits. Svityaz ASC represents a unique system that allows launch of spacecraft without utilization of complicated ground infrastructure. The Svityaz was to be launched directly from a modified version of An-225 Mriya, a Ukrainian airplane and airplane carrier that was the largest one in the world, prior to its destruction during attacks in 2022. The modified Mriya, that was to be used to carry Svityaz, was designated with the extension code of An-225-100.

The aircraft is equipped with special devices to secure the LV above the fuselage. The operators and onboard equipment are located in the pressure-tight cabins. The Svityaz LV is being created on the basis of units, aggregates and systems of Zenit LV. It consists of three stages of non-toxic propellants — liquid oxygen and kerosene. The launch vehicle would be injected into the geostationary orbit using a solid-propellant apogee stage.

Sea Launch project 

See more detailed article at Sea Launch

Sea Launch was a joint venture space transportation company, partially owned by companies in Ukraine which handle operations for the National Space Agency. Sea Launch offered a mobile sea platform, used for spacecraft launches of commercial payloads on specialized Ukrainian Zenit 3SL rockets. The main advantage of the floating cosmodrome is its placement directly on the equator. It allows taking the greatest advantage of Earth's rotation to deliver payloads into orbit at low expense.

Within the framework of the project the space rocket complex was developed, which consists of four components:

 marine segment
 rocket segment
 spacecraft segment, and
 facilities

Sea Launch mothballed its ships and put operations on long-term hiatus in 2014.

Spaceports
Ukraine does not have its own spaceports, but leases elsewhere.
 Baikonur Cosmodrome, Baikonur, Kazakhstan (under Russian administration)
 Plesetsk Cosmodrome, Arkhangelsk Oblast, Russia
 Dombarovsky Air Base, Orenburg Oblast, Russia
 Odyssey (launch platform) stationed in the Pacific near Kiribati
 Alcântara Launch Center, Maranhão, Brazil

Satellite programs 
Ukraine produced the Sich and Okean Earth observation satellites, as well as a few other types of satellites and the Coronas solar observatory in cooperation with Russia.

 1995–2001 Sich-1 (Tsyklon-3 from Plesetsk)
 1999–???? Okean (Zenit-2 from Baikonur)
 2004–active Sich-1M (Tsyklon-3 from Plesetsk)
 2004–2007 MC-1-TK (Tsyklon-3 from Plesetsk)
 2011–2012 Sich-2 (Dnepr from Dombarovskiy)
 2014–active PolyITAN-1 (CubeSat-type satellite by Dnepr from Dombarovskiy)
 2017–active PolyITAN-2 (CubeSat-type satellite by Atlas V from Cape Canaveral)
 suspended Lybid 1 (planned to be launched 2018 by Zenit-3F from Baikonur)
 suspended Sich-2M (planned to be launched 2018 by Dnepr)
 canceled Ukrselena (planned to be launched 2017 by Dnepr; being revised)

The SSAU currently is working on further Sich series satellites: Sich-2M, Sich-3, Sich-3-O and Sich-3-P; Lybid M and an Ukrselena satellite to fly around the Moon in 2017 (postponed). The optical satellite  was successfully launched on 13 January 2022.

Ground complexes

 SSAU main special control center
 SSAU ground information complex 
 SSAU ground control complex 
 SSAU Space Monitoring and Analysis System 
 SSAU remote telemetric stations 
 SSAU ground-based broadcasting network of satellite television channels 
 SSAU system of positioning and timing and navigation
 Pluton complex, temporarily inaccessible, due to Russian occupation

Human flights 

Prior to Ukraine's independence, several Ukrainians flew in space under the Soviet flag. Ukrainian Pavlo Popovych was the fourth cosmonaut in space, in 1962.

The first Ukrainian to fly in space under the Ukrainian flag was Leonid K. Kadenyuk on 13 May 1997. He was a payload specialist on NASA's STS-87 Space Shuttle mission. It was an international spaceflight mission, involving crew members from NASA (USA), NSAU (Ukraine) and NASDA (Japan).

Director-General
 Volodymyr Horbulin (March 9, 1992 - August 12, 1994)
 Andriy Zhalko-Titarenko (August 23, 1994 - March 9, 1995)
 Oleksandr Nehoda (February 20, 1995 - July 25, 2005)
 Yuriy Alekseyev (July 25, 2005 - February 11, 2009)
 Oleksandr Zinchenko (February 11, 2009 - March 17, 2010)
 Yuriy Alekseyev (March 17, 2010 - November 28, 2014)
 Oleksandr Holub (October 16, 2014 - January 21, 2015)
 Oleh Urusky (January 21 - August 19, 2015)
 Liubomyr Sabadosh (August 19, 2015 - July 22, 2016)
 Oleksandr Holub (July 25 - September 13, 2016)
 Yuriy Radchenko (interim) (September 14, 2016 – August 31, 2017)
 Pavlo Dehtyarenko (August 31, 2017 – November 3, 2019)
 Volodymyr Mikheev (interim) (November 3, 2019 – January 24, 2020)
 Volodymyr Usov (January 24 - November 16, 2020)
Mykhailo Lev (interim) (since November 16, 2020)

See also 
 Lviv Centre of Institute for Space Research
 A Message From Earth (AMFE) was sent by NSAU towards Gliese 581 c, a large terrestrial extrasolar planet orbiting the red dwarf star Gliese 581. The signal is a digital time capsule containing 501 messages.
 List of government space agencies
 Ukrainian Optical Facilities for Near-Earth Space Surveillance Network

References

External links 

 English-language home page
 Ukrainian space history on Astronautix.com encyclopedia
 Ukraine's Space Program  - article in Moscow Defense Brief
 NASA, Ukraine Prepare Flights to Moon, RedNova News
 Ukrainian Rockets to Orbit U.S. Satellites, Novosti
Yuzhnoe SDO, major Ukrainian Space Technologies Design Bureau
Cosmos Agency — first private Ukrainian aerospace company

 
Ukraine
Ukrainian space institutions
Independent agencies of the Ukrainian government
Defense industry of Ukraine